The 2021 Copa do Nordeste was the 18th edition of the main football tournament featuring teams from the Brazilian Northeast Region. The competition featured 16 clubs, with Bahia, Ceará and Pernambuco having two seeds each, and Rio Grande do Norte, Sergipe, Alagoas, Paraíba, Maranhão and Piauí with one seed each. Four teams were decided by a qualifying tournament (Pré-Copa do Nordeste). The Copa do Nordeste began on 27 February and ended on 8 May.

Tied on aggregate 2–2, Bahia defeated the defending champions Ceará on penalties in the finals to win their fourth title. As champions, Bahia qualified for the third round of the 2022 Copa do Brasil.

Format
In this season, 12 teams (9 state league champions and best placed teams in the 2020 CBF ranking from Bahia, Ceará and Pernambuco) gained direct entries into the group stage while the other four berths were decided by the Pré-Copa do Nordeste.

For the group stage, the 16 teams were drawn into two groups. Each team played once against the eight clubs from the other group. Top four teams qualified for the final stages. Quarter-finals and semi-finals were played on a single-leg basis and finals were played on a home-and-away two-legged basis.

Teams

2021 Pré-Copa do Nordeste
The 2021 Pré-Copa do Nordeste was the qualifying tournament of 2021 Copa do Nordeste. It was played from 16 December 2020 to 2 February 2021. Eight teams competed to decide four places in the Copa do Nordeste. Teams from Alagoas, Maranhão, Paraíba, Pernambuco, Piauí, Rio Grande do Norte and Sergipe qualified as best placed teams in the 2020 CBF ranking not already qualified, while the team from Bahia qualified through the 2020 Campeonato Baiano (best placed team not already qualified, runners-up Atlético de Alagoinhas).

Draw
The draw was held on 4 November 2020, 10:00, at the CBF headquarters in Rio de Janeiro. Teams were seeded by their 2020 CBF ranking (shown in parentheses). The eight teams were drawn into four ties, with the Pot A teams hosting the second leg.

Each tie was played on a home-and-away two-legged basis. If tied on aggregate, extra time would not be played and a penalty shoot-out would be used to determine the winner. The away goals rule would not be used (Regulations Pré-Copa do Nordeste Article 10).

Matches

|}
Santa Cruz, CSA, Botafogo-PB and Altos qualified for 2021 Copa do Nordeste.

Qualified teams

Schedule
The schedule of the competition was as follows.

Draw
The draw for the group stage was held on 4 February 2021, 12:00, at the CBF headquarters in Rio de Janeiro. The 16 teams were drawn into two groups of eight containing two teams from each of the four pots with the restriction that teams from the same federation (except Salgueiro) could not be drawn into the same group. Teams were seeded by their 2020 CBF ranking (shown in parentheses).

Group stage
For the group stage, the 16 teams were drawn into two groups of eight teams each. Each team played on a single round-robin tournament against the eight clubs from the other group. The top four teams of each group advanced to the quarter-finals of the knockout stages. The teams were ranked according to points (3 points for a win, 1 point for a draw, and 0 points for a loss). If tied on points, the following criteria would be used to determine the ranking: 1. Wins; 2. Goal difference; 3. Goals scored; 4. Fewest red cards; 5. Fewest yellow cards; 6. Draw in the headquarters of the Brazilian Football Confederation (Regulations Article 12).

Group A

Group B

Results

Final stages
Starting from the quarter-finals, the teams played a single-elimination tournament with the following rules:
Quarter-finals and semi-finals were played on a single-leg basis, with the higher-seeded team hosting the leg.
 If tied, the penalty shoot-out would be used to determine the winners (Regulations Article 10).
Finals were played on a home-and-away two-legged basis, with the higher-seeded team hosting the second leg.
 If tied on aggregate, the penalty shoot-out would be used to determine the winners (Regulations Article 16).
Extra time would not be played and away goals rule would not be used in final stages.

Starting from the semi-finals, the teams were seeded according to their performance in the tournament. The teams were ranked according to overall points. If tied on overall points, the following criteria would be used to determine the ranking: 1. Overall wins; 2. Overall goal difference; 3. Overall goals scored; 4. Fewest red cards in the tournament; 5. Fewest yellow cards in the tournament; 6. Draw in the headquarters of the Brazilian Football Confederation (Regulations Article 17).

Bracket

Quarter-finals

|}

Group C

Group D

Group E

Group F

Semi-finals

|}

Group G

Group H

Finals

|}

Group I

Top goalscorers

2021 Copa do Nordeste team
The 2021 Copa do Nordeste team was a squad consisting of the eleven most impressive players at the tournament.

||

References

2021 domestic association football cups
Copa do Nordeste
2021 in Brazilian football